Colura irrorata is a species of liverworts in family Lejeuneaceae. It is endemic to Ecuador.  Its natural habitat is subtropical or tropical moist lowland forests. It is threatened by habitat loss. The species was previously place known as Myriocolea irrorata, but was transferred to Colura in 2012 following a phylogenetic analysis of nuclear and plastid molecular markers and a reinterpretation of morphological characters.

References

Lejeuneaceae
Flora of Ecuador
Critically endangered plants
Taxonomy articles created by Polbot
Taxobox binomials not recognized by IUCN